Grabówka  is a village in the administrative district of Gmina Bierawa, within Kędzierzyn-Koźle County, Opole Voivodeship, in south-western Poland.

The village has a population of 216.

Gallery

References

Villages in Kędzierzyn-Koźle County